Topol pri Begunjah is a village east of Begunje in the Municipality of Cerknica in the Inner Carniola region of Slovenia.

Name
The name of the settlement was changed from Topol to Topol pri Begunjah in 1953.

Church

The local church is dedicated to Saint Thomas and belongs to the Parish of Begunje pri Cerknici.

References

External links

Topol pri Begunjah on Geopedia

Populated places in the Municipality of Cerknica